7 Minutes is a 2014 American crime thriller drama film, written and directed by Jay Martin and starring Luke Mitchell, Jason Ritter, Leven Rambin, Zane Holtz, Kevin Gage, Brandon Hardesty, Joel Murray and Kris Kristofferson. It follows three high school friends, who are forced to commit a brazen robbery which quickly goes horribly wrong. It received its world premiere on October 26, 2014 at the Austin Film Festival, and then premiered at the Sarasota Film Festival on April 16, 2015. The film received a limited release and through video-on-demand on June 26, 2015 by Starz Distribution.

Plot
Three friends, Sam (Luke Mitchell), Mike (Jason Ritter) and Owen (Zane Holtz), are forced to commit a brazen robbery. What begins as a simple plan - 'in and out in seven minutes' - quickly becomes a dangerous game of life and death as complications arise. As each minute of the robbery unfolds, the stakes are pushed higher and higher. In the final act, Sam's pregnant girlfriend Kate is kidnapped, escalating the situation even further and pressing the trio to do whatever they can to make it out alive.

Cast

 Luke Mitchell as Sam
 Jason Ritter as Mike
 Leven Rambin as Kate
 Zane Holtz as Owen
 Kris Kristofferson as Mr. B
 Russell Hodgkinson as Lawrence
 Joel Murray as Uncle Pete
 Kevin Gage as Tuckey
 Chris Soldevill as Doug
 Brandon Hardesty as Jerome
 Mariel Neto as Brandi

Production
Filming took place in Everett, Washington, United States during April and May in 2013.

Release
The film has its world premiere at the Austin Film Festival on October 26, 2014. The film then premiered at the Sarasota Film Festival on April 16, 2015. In January 2015, Starz Digital Media acquired the North American rights. The film was finally released in the US with a limited release and through video-on-demand on June 26, 2015. It was released on DVD and Blu-ray by Anchor Bay Entertainment on September 1, 2015.

Critical response
7 Minutes received negative reviews from film critics. On Rotten Tomatoes, a review aggregator website, it received a 19% approval rating and an average rating of 3.7 out of 10, based on 13 critics. On Metacritic, it holds a rating of 35 out of 100, indicating 'generally unfavorable reviews' based on 9 critics.

In a positive review, Linda Bernard of the Toronto Star gave the film 3 out of 4 stars stating "A solid score and tight camerawork shows Martin's background as a music video director translates well to big-screen work." Jesse Hassenger of The A.V. Club gave the film a C−, saying "though 7 Minutes does offer an impressive array of backstories for a film that initially appears to be about three semi-interchangeable guys, most of those backstories are still dominated by clichés".

In a more negative review, Rex Reed of The New York Observer gave the film one star out of four, commenting "like most of today's young directors who neither want to nor know how to tell an actual story in a traditional way with a beginning, middle and end, writer-director Jay Martin jumps around like a spastic colon."

References

External links
 
 
 

2014 films
Films shot in Washington (state)
American crime thriller films
American thriller drama films
2010s English-language films
2010s American films